The  San Jose SaberCats season was the 16th season for the franchise in the Arena Football League. The team was coached by Darren Arbet and played their home games at HP Pavilion at San Jose. After finishing the regular season with a 12–6 record, the SaberCats qualified for the playoffs, but lost in the conference semifinals to the Arizona Rattlers, 48–51.

Standings

Schedule

Regular season
The SaberCats began the season at home against the Arizona Rattlers on March 10. They hosted the Iowa Barnstormers on July 14, in their final regular season game.

Playoffs

Final roster

References

San Jose SaberCats
San Jose SaberCats seasons
San